Félix Suárez (born in State of Mexico) in 1961) is a Mexican poet, essayist and editor.

External links 
 Profile in Círculo De Poesía.
 Publication timeline on WorldCat.

Mexican poets
Spanish poets
1961 births
Living people